Lyzohub (Russian: Лизогубы; also spelled as Lizohub, Lisohub, Lizogub) was a Ukrainian family of the Cossack Hetmanate. For years many members of the family had high offices in the Ukrainian government.

Origins 
There are two versions of the origins of the Lizohub (Lisohub) family. One claims they descended from the Kobyzewicz family who were Lithuanian boyars. According to the historian Volodymyr Antonovych who referred to the chronicles of the Lizohub family, the family was descended from a Cossack Klim Lizohub who was killed in action in the battle of Lvov in 1648.

The first version was further developed by Ukrainian historians A. Lazarevsky, V. Lukomsky and G. Miloradovich. According to them, Kondratiy Ivanovich Kobyzewicz (Kobyzenko), a Cossack of Gelmyaziv of the Pereyaslavl regiment, supposedly acquired the nickname of Lizohub. The family supposedly had an estate at Vilichki, near Chernigov. I. Kondratiev and V. Krivoshey attributed Kondratiy Lizohub to the Liubech gentry (szlachta).

Kondratiy Lizohub supposedly had a daughter named Christiana, and sons: Yakov, Ivan and Klim.

The researcher Erwin Miden, a post-graduate student of the Chernigov National Pedagogical University, has debunked the myth of the Lizohub family's descent from the Kobyzewicz clan. He has also showcased in his article on Colonel Ivan Lizohub, that his Polish nobility was fabricated by his descendants in the 18th century.

The patent supposedly given to Ivan Lizohub (under the name of Jan Kobyzewicz) by King Jan Casimir Vasa in 1661 only exists in the copy submitted to the Chernigov Nobility Assembly by cornet Jakov Lizohub in 1799. E. Miden has showcased that the document was fabricated as no record regarding the ennoblement of Ivan Lizohub exists in the archive of the Warsaw General Sejm of 1661, which was to confirm such ennoblement. Amongst the papers submitted by Jakov Lizohub in 1799 was a patent of nobility supposedly given to their progenitor, the assumed father of Cossack Kondraty Lizohub, Ivan Lizohub, in 1642 by King Jan Casimir Vasa, when he entered the throne only in 1648.

Ivan (Jan) Kondratovich Kobyzewicz-Lizohub was the colonel of the Uman' and Kanev Cossack regiments. In 1658 he represented Hetman Ivan Vygovsky in Moscow. Brothers Ivan and Jakov Lizohub sought Moscow nobility. They acquired Moscow nobility (dvorianstvo) before 1667 for spying for the Moscow government.

Yakov Kondratovich Lizohub became the colonel of the Kanev Cossack regiment in 1665. In 1667 he led an embassy of Hetman I. Bryukhovetsky to Moscow, where he received a patent of nobility. In 1669—1674 he was the yesaul general of the Cossack army, and in 1670—1673 — an interim hetman. As the colonel of Chernigov, Yakov Lizohub took over the lands of his predecessor, G. Samoylovich, including the estate of Sedniv that had become the family's main seat.

Yakov Kondratovich Lizohub is claimed to be the father of Efim Lizohub, the Chernigov Cossack colonel, who married the daughter of Hetman Petr Doroshenko, Lyubov. Their son, Yakov Yukhimovich Lizohub, became the family's most famed member.

Notable family members 
 Ivan Kindratovych Lyzohub (? - after 1662), colonel of Kaniv and Uman regiments, envoy of Ivan Vyhovsky to the Muscovy, participant of the Battle of Konotop, executed on orders of Yuri Khmelnytsky
 Yakiv Kindrotovych Lyzohub (?–1698), colonel of Kaniv regiment
 Yakiv Yukhymovych Lyzohub (1675–1749) - Quartermaster General, acting hetman, member of the Governing Council of the Hetman Office
 Fedir Andriyovych Lyzohub (1862–1928), a Prime Minister of Ukraine (1918).

Relation to Nikolai Gogol 
Nikolai Gogol's grandmother was Tatiana Lizohub, the daughter of the Chernigov landlord Semyon Semyonovich Lizohub. Tatyana Lizohub was a great-granddaughter of Hetman Pyotr Doroshenko and a granddaughter of Hetman Ivan Skoropadsky. She secretly married her teacher Afanasiy Yanovsky. A connection to the Lizohub family allowed Afanasy Yanovsky to pursue military career. Later, he made himself ennobled as a claimant to the descent from hetman Ostap Gogol.

Gallery

See also 
 Doroshenko family

External links

 Syundyukov, I. Then I am going to Sednev.... Newspaper Den. 25 November 2005
 Regimental chancellery. Chernihiv. Castles and Temples of Ukraine.
 Sedniv. Castles and Temples of Ukraine.

References

 
Cossack Hetmanate
Zaporizhian Cossacks noble families
Ukrainian noble families
Russian noble families